The Tyneside Amateur League is a football competition based in England. It has one division, which sits at level 14 of the English football league system. It is a feeder to the Northern Alliance.

The League was formed in 1949 and was 60 years old in 2009. To celebrate this the League held a dinner with John Beresford as the guest speaker on 12 June at The Lancastrian Suite of the Dunston Federation Brewery.

Final member clubs
Gosforth Bohemian Reserves
Haltwhistle Jubilee
Morpeth FC
Newcastle Benfield Reserves
Newcastle Chemfica Amateurs
Newcastle Medicals
Ponteland United Reserves
Red House Farm
Swalwell Juniors
Wallsend B.C. Senior Development
West Jesmond
Wideopen

Champions

External links
FA Full Time page
Football Mitoo page

 
Defunct football leagues in England
Sports leagues established in 1949
1949 establishments in England
2019 disestablishments in England
Football in Tyne and Wear